This is a list of major NJPW events, detailing all notable professional wrestling cards promoted on pay-per-view (PPV), live TV broadcast by TV Asahi & New Japan Pro-Wrestling World by New Japan Pro-Wrestling (NJPW).

Past events

2007

2008

2009

2010

2011

2012

2013

2014

2015

2016

2017

2018

2019

2020

2021

2022

2023

Upcoming event schedule

2023

Number of events by year 
 2007 – 2
 2008 – 2
 2009 – 4
 2010 – 4
 2011 – 6
 2012 – 7
 2013 – 8
 2014 – 12
 2015 – 9
 2016 – 11
 2017 – 17
 2018 – 18
 2019 – 17
 2020 – 9
 2021 – 17
 2022 – 16
 2023 – 17 (7 upcoming)
 Total – 169 (7 confirmed)

Notes

See also 

 List of All Elite Wrestling pay-per-view events
 List of ECW supercards and pay-per-view events
 List of FMW supercards and pay-per-view events
 List of Global Force Wrestling events and specials
 List of Impact Wrestling pay-per-view events
 List of Major League Wrestling events
 List of National Wrestling Alliance pay-per-view events
 List of NWA/WCW closed-circuit events and pay-per-view events
 List of Ring of Honor pay-per-view events
 List of Smokey Mountain Wrestling supercard events
 List of WCW Clash of the Champions shows
 List of World Class Championship Wrestling Supercard events
 List of WWA pay-per-view events
 List of WWE pay-per-view and WWE Network events
 List of WWE Saturday Night Main Event shows
 List of WWE Tribute to the Troops shows

References 

Pay-per-view events
NJPW pay-per-view events
New Japan Pro-Wrestling
Professional wrestling-related lists